Rio Rita is a 1927 stage musical with a book by Guy Bolton and Fred Thompson, music by Harry Tierney, lyrics by Joseph McCarthy, and produced by Florenz Ziegfeld. This musical united Bert Wheeler and Robert Woolsey as a comedy team and made them famous.

It premiered on Broadway on February 2, 1927, at the new Ziegfeld Theatre and, after moving to the Lyric Theatre and Majestic Theatre, closed on April 7, 1928 after 494 performances, a very long run for its time. In Sydney, Gladys Moncrieff appeared in a successful production at the St James Theatre. The musical premiered in London's West End on April 3, 1930, at the then newly opened Prince Edward Theatre. 
 
The musical was made into a film in 1929, Rio Rita, starring Bebe Daniels and John Boles along with the team of Wheeler & Woolsey. Based on the success of this film, Wheeler & Woolsey were also given contracts to star in a series of comedies.  Another film based on the musical was made in 1942.

Background 
Rio Rita may be said to be one of the last, great, "light musical comedies" or "Follies-based" type of musical. With the introduction of Show Boat, later in 1927—as well as the subsequent introduction of George Gershwin's musicals that year and through the early 1930s—the American musical became much more a dramatically cohesive "musical play". This form reached its maturity in the Rodgers and Hammerstein productions, beginning with Oklahoma! and culminating with South Pacific.

Synopsis
   
The captain of the Texas Rangers, Jim Stewart, is in San Lucar Mexico on the Rio Grande, in disguise in order to catch the notorious bandit Kinkajou. While there, he falls in love with Rita Ferguson, an Irish-American-Mexican girl who sings in the local hotel after being displaced, along with her brother, from her family ranch.

General Esteban, the Governor of the San Lucar District, also loves Rita and hates all gringos. He hatches a plot to set Jim and Rita at odds by making Rita doubt both her own brother, who may be the Kinkajou, and Jim, who may be spying on her brother through her.

Amid all of this intrigue, Chick Bean, a soap salesman, and Dolly, an American cabaret girl, arrive in San Lucar and get married. Unbeknownst to Dolly, Chick also went to Mexico to obtain a quick divorce from his unfaithful first wife, Katie. But then hours after Chick and Dolly are wed, Ed Lovett, a lawyer of dubious reputation, informs Chick that his divorce is not recognized by the U.S. Government. Complications ensue.

Original Broadway cast
Rita Ferguson – Ethelind Terry
Captain Jim Stewart – J. Harold Murray
Ed Lovett – Robert Woolsey
Chick Bean – Bert Wheeler
General Esteban – Vincent Serrano
Dolly Bean – Ada-May
Roberto Ferguson – Walter Petrie
Carmen – Helen C. Clive
Katie Bean – Noel Francis
Montezuma's Daughter – Katherine Burke
Reporter – Al Clair
Sergeant Wilkins – Donald Douglas

Songs

Act I
Overture
Opening chorus ("The world loves a lover, they say")
The Best little lover in Town - Lovett, chorus of girls
Sweetheart - Rita, chorus of girls
River Song ("Down By the River of My Dreams") - Rita
Eight Little Gringos - gringo girls
Are You There? - Dolly, Chick
Rio Rita - Rita, Jim
Rangers' chorus - rangers
March of the rangers - Jim, rangers
Spanish Shawl ("Beneath the Silken Shawl") - Carmen, serenaders
The Kinkajou - chorus
You're Always In My Arms" - Rita
If You're in Love, you'll Waltz - Rita, Jim
Moonlight ballet
Out on the Loose - Chick, girls
Finale, Act 1

Act II
Opening dance
Yo Ho and a Bottle of Rum - girls
The Black and White Ballet - girls
Come, take a Trip - chorus
I can Speak Espagnol - Dolly, Lovett
Roses - Jim, Rita
Following the Sun Around - Jim
You're Always in My Arms (reprise) - Rita
The Best Little Lover in Town (reprise) - Lovett
Rio Rita (reprise) - Jim
Incidental music
Following the Sun around (reprise) - katie
Finale, Act 2 - ensemble

Notes
It was this musical that Charles Lindbergh was attending when he got news from the Weather Bureau that clear skies were opening over the Atlantic Ocean. Lindbergh then hurried to his hotel room, but could not sleep, and then to the Roosevelt airfield to take off on his famous flight to Paris in the Spirit of St. Louis.

External links
Internet Broadway Database listing
Rio Rita plot, song list, and characters
broadwayworld.com listing, London

Broadway musicals
1927 musicals
Musicals by Fred Thompson (writer)